Nach  may refer to:

 NACH, National Automation Clearing House
 Nach (Bible acronym), an acronym for Nevi'im Ksuvim/Ktuvim (the Prophets and (Holy) Writings of Tanach)
 Nach (rapper), Spanish rap performance artist Ignacio Fornés Olmo, initially known as Nach Scratch

See also

 
 Naach (disambiguation)
 Nack (disambiguation)
 Nakh (disambiguation)

Language and nationality disambiguation pages